Series 2 of the ITV programme Foyle's War was first aired in 2003; comprising four episodes, it is set in autumn 1940. Series 2 was broadcast in the United States on PBS on Mystery!, on 18 and 25 July, and 1 and 8 August 2004, as Foyle's War II, and on Netflix as of April 2014.

Episodes

"Fifty Ships"

Cast and Characters
This episode introduces Foyle's former love, Elizabeth Lewes, whom he had hoped to marry some 20 years ago, if permission had not been withheld by her father. It is established that Stewart is 22 years old. And Foyle’s warning to Paige in this episode is later fulfilled in "The Eternity Ring" (Series 7, Episode 1), when Foyle returns from America having confronted Paige there and perhaps provoked his suicide.

Background and Production
The title refers to the Destroyers for Bases Agreement, under which the United States traded 50 U.S. Navy destroyers to the U.K. in exchange for land rights in certain British colonies. The agreement was a reversal of the U.S.'s isolationist policy and a precursor to the much more substantial Lend-Lease programme. The edition of the Eastbourne Chronicle announcing the visit of Paige to Hastings is dated "Wednesday September 14, 1940". Therefore, this episode starts the day after the Season 1 episode - "Eagle Day". The episode also reveals the darker side of the war effort: those willing to profit in wartime at the expense of their countrymen. The subplot involving the capture of the character Hans Maier is based upon a real incident in which a German spy, Carl Meier, was caught in a similar way.

"Among the Few"

Cast and Characters
The relationship and sense of trust between Christopher Foyle and his son Andrew is tested when Foyle learns details of Andrew’s secretive sexual relationship with (and "engagement" to) Dewar's friend Violet Davies. Foyle again "bends the rules" in deference to the needs of wartime by allowing Talbot, who has confessed to accidentally causing Dewar's death, to lead the squadron on one last sortie (in which he is killed), and then consoles his own son afterwards by praising Talbot as a good man.

Background and Production
This episode addresses petrol theft and black-marketeering in the new era of wartime rationing, in which petrol was the first item to be restricted.. The flying Supermarine Spitfire featured in this episode was Historic Aircraft Collection's Spitfire Mk.Vb BM597, and the airfield filming took place at Dunsfold.

"War Games"

Cast and Characters
This episode marks the brief return (prior to reassignment to North Africa with the 7th Armoured Division) of Foyle's former police sergeant, now a British Army captain, Jack Devlin, who left with the BEF for France and was wounded by shrapnel there. It also provides details of how Devlin was involved in planting evidence and perverting the course of justice in the Markham case six months earlier. Throughout the episode, Foyle is confronted with moral dilemmas and legal compromises made for the sake of the war. And it marks the first appearance of Hilda Pierce, played by Ellie Haddington, who later appears in the episodes "The French Drop" and "All Clear", before becoming a lead character in series 7 and 8.

Background and Production
This episode introduces children competing to win minor salvaging competitions, particularly with aluminium, glass and used paper. It also deals with the phenomena of the looting of Jewish treasures and the continued collaboration of British companies with the Germans in the guise of war profiteering contrary to the Trading with the Enemy Act 1939.

"The Funk Hole"

Cast and Characters
Andrew is on a week’s medical leave, after fog forced him to ditch his plane in the English Channel. After Stewart’s invitation for a companionable outing at his father's suggestion turns sour, he apologises to Stewart and takes her to see Gone With the Wind. After the movie, while walking back home, they share a kiss and begin a romantic relationship. Meanwhile, Foyle's tense relationship with his former boss's successor is also shown, when Foyle arrives unannounced in London and confronts him over the handling of the case against him. Also, in Foyle's absence, Stewart is unwillingly compelled to temporarily return to her position at the Mechanised Transport Corps depot.

Background and Production
In the first year of the war, the British government made dire predictions of the amount of bombing in major cities that would occur and moved large numbers of people out to the countryside. Later, the government reversed these predictions, but certain people who had the means to pay preferred to stay in their temporary lodgings, out of danger. Such hotels and guest houses became known as "funk holes" because their residents' actions were regarded as cowardice. Further, with daily goods and pet-food in short supply due to wartime rationing, black marketeering of foodstuffs was also an ongoing issue for the authorities.

International broadcast
Series 2 was broadcast in the United States on PBS on Mystery!, on 18 and 25 July, and 1 and 8 August 2004, as Foyle's War II, and on Netflix as of April 2014.

References

External links 
 Series 2 on IMDb

Fiction set in 1940
Foyle's War episodes
2003 British television seasons